Montagne du Château is the highest hill of the Jorat. It lies west of Montpreveyres in the canton of Vaud, above the city of Lausanne. The hill is entirely wooded, except for its summit, where is a clearing.

See also
List of mountains of Vaud
List of most isolated mountains of Switzerland

References

Mountains of the canton of Vaud
Mountains of Switzerland
Mountains of Switzerland under 1000 metres